Eslamabad (also Romanized as Eslāmābād) is a village in Soghan Rural District, Soghan District, Arzuiyeh County, Kerman Province, Iran. At the 2006 census, its population was 226, in 48 families.

References 

Populated places in Arzuiyeh County